Ronald Colling (born 25 April 1947) is a South African cricketer. He played in fifteen first-class and two List A matches for Eastern Province from 1966/67 to 1973/74.

See also
 List of Eastern Province representative cricketers

References

External links
 

1947 births
Living people
South African cricketers
Eastern Province cricketers
People from Roodepoort